Ragozino is a rural locality (a village) in Sidorovskoye Rural Settlement, Gryazovetsky District, Vologda Oblast, Russia. The population was 46 as of 2002.

Geography 
Ragozino is located 31 km east of Gryazovets (the district's administrative centre) by road. Shushukovo is the nearest rural locality.

References 

Rural localities in Gryazovetsky District